Ano Symi, (Turkish: Ano Simi) also called Ano Simi, Epáno Sími (Greek: "Upper Symi"), or more commonly Horio or Chorio is the main town of the island of Symi, north-west of the island of Rhodes in Greece. It is situated in one of the most picturesque areas of Symi, and was for many years largely abandoned by its people, though in recent years has seen some resurgence. 

There are many interesting churches in Ano Simi, with some dating from the Byzantine era: e.g. Aghios Georgios and Metamorfosis.  There is also an archaeological museum and the Kastro, the Castle of the Knights of St. John.

Dodecanese